The Hong Kong Arts Festival (HKAF), launched in 1973, is a major international arts festival committed to enriching the cultural life of the city by presenting leading local and international artists in all genres of the performing arts as well as a diverse range of “PLUS” and educational events in February and March each year.

Genres seen and heard at the Hong Kong Arts Festival include classical music, Chinese music, world music, Western opera, Chinese opera, drama and dance. HKAF presented top international artists and ensembles, such as Cecilia Bartoli, José Carreras, Yo-Yo Ma, Philip Glass, Kurt Masur, Riccardo Chailly, Mikhail Baryshnikov, Sylvie Guillem, Kevin Spacey, Royal Concertgebouw Orchestra, Mariinsky Theatre, Bavarian State Opera, New York City Ballet, Paris Opera Ballet, Tanztheater Wuppertal Pina Bausch, Cloud Gate Dance Theater, Zingaro, Royal Shakespeare Company, Moscow Art Theatre, and Beijing People's Art Theatre.

HKAF actively collaborates with Hong Kong’s own creative talent and showcases emerging local artists. Over the years, HKAF has commissioned and produced over 200 local productions across genres including Cantonese opera, theatre, chamber opera, music and contemporary dance, many with successful subsequent runs in Hong Kong and overseas.

HKAF frequently partners with renowned international artists and institutions to produce exceptional works, such as Der Fensterputzer (The Window Washer) co-produced by HKAF, Goethe-Institut Hong Kong and Tanztheater Wuppertal Pina Bausch, Richard III and The Tempest produced by The Old Vic, BAM and Neal Street under “The Bridge Project” with HKAF as a co-commissioning institution, Green Snake co-commissioned with Shanghai International Arts Festival, and Dream of the Red Chamber co-produced with San Francisco Opera.

HKAF invests heavily in arts education for young people. The “HKAF Young Friends” has reached over 782,000 local secondary and tertiary school students since 1992. Close to 10,000 half-price student tickets are issued each year.

HKAF organises a diverse range of “Festival PLUS” activities in community locations each year to enhance engagement between artists and audiences. These include films, lecture demonstrations, masterclasses, workshops, symposia, backstage visits, exhibitions, meet-the-artist sessions, and guided cultural tours.

HKAF is a non-profit organisation. Its principal income sources are recurrent funding from the government, box office revenues, and sponsorship and donations made by corporations, individuals and charitable foundations which form a significant portion of total income and also enable HKAF to receive support from the Government’s matching scheme that matches income generated through private sector sponsorship and donations.

List of Committee Members (The 49th Hong Kong Arts Festival, 2021)

Past and Current Chairmen and Directors

Past Festival Programmes (incomplete)

New works and recent tours 
The HKAF is very active at promoting and engaging homegrown creative talents and emerging artists through commissioning producing and publishing new works in theatre, chamber opera and contemporary dance. Some of these productions go on to successful subsequent runs in Hong Kong and overseas.

In 2008, the HKAF commissioned and produced the production, Titus Andronicus by William Shakespeare for the 36th HKAF as part of its New Works series, and was later featured in a second run in the 40th HKAF in 2012 before participating in Globe to Globe, a World Shakespeare Festival at the Globe Theatre in London in which 37 of Shakespeare’s plays were performed in different languages. This was the first Cantonese production to be performed at the Globe.

The HKAF in 2014 featured FILTH by Jingan Young, the first English language play ever commissioned by the festival.

In 2013, the 41st HKAF commissioned the New Stage Series, Heart of Coral, a chamber opera about the life of Xiao Hong, one of the most celebrated female Chinese writers. The opera production was later featured in Taiwan at "Hong Kong Week 2014 @ Taipei" as part of a cultural exchange organized by the Hong Kong-Taiwan Cultural Co-operation Committee.

The Crowd, another HKAF commissioned production which is written by Shanghai-based writer Yu Rongjun and directed by Hong Kong theater director, Tang Wai-kit for the HKAF in 2015 was also performed in Shanghai in April 2015.

Co-commissioned by the HKAF and the Shakespeare’s Globe, renowned Hong Kong theatre director Tang Shu-wing premiered his Cantonese production of Macbeth at the Globe Theatre in London in August 2015, 4 years after the debut of his production of Titus Andronicus as part of the Globe to Globe initiative. Macbeth was then staged at the 44th HKAF.

Awards, Achievements and Contributions

Recent Publications

References

External links
Official HKAF site
The 38th Hong Kong Arts Festival 2010 
The 39th Hong Kong Arts Festival 2011 – Events list

Festivals in Hong Kong
Festivals established in 1973
1973 establishments in Hong Kong